Pat Simmons may refer to:

 Pat Simmons (voice actress) (1920–2005), voice of the United Kingdom's Speaking Clock from 1963 until 1985
 Pat Simmons (curler) (born 1974), Canadian curler
 Pat Simmons (baseball) (1908–1968), relief pitcher in Major League Baseball

See also 
 Patrick Simmons (disambiguation)